Šventoji (Samogitian: Švėntuojė) is a small resort town on the coast of the Baltic Sea in Lithuania. Administratively it is part of Palanga City Municipality. The total population of Šventoji as of 2012 was 2631. The town is located about 12 km north of Palanga center and close to the border with Latvia. Further north of the town is Būtingė and its oil terminal. Šventoji River flows into the Baltic sea at the town. The town also has a famous lighthouse, which is located 780 meters from the sea. Its height is 39 meters. The town is a popular summer resort for families, during summer it has many cafes, restaurants and various attractions for the visitors.

Šventoji is an important archaeological site as the first artefacts are dated about 3000 BC. A famous cane shaped as moose head was also found in the town. It is a former fishing village now turned into a tourist town. The town always struggled to develop a port, which had to compete with nearby Klaipėda and Liepāja. A larger port was constructed in the second half of the 17th century, especially since 1679, when it was leased to English merchants. It was destroyed in 1701 during the Great Northern War. During the times of the Russian Empire (1795–1915) the port was moribund.

In 1919, after the breakup of the Russian Empire, Šventoji became a part of Latvia, like the rest of the Courland Governorate. In 1921 the town was peacefully transferred to Lithuania following a Lithuanian-Latvian treaty.

After the territorial transfer, the town became crucially important for Lithuania as one of its few points of access to the sea. The sea port began developing again: two piers were constructed, but they were frequently covered in sand.

Thus, it never grew into a bigger port, although Šventoji briefly became vital to Lithuania in the brief period between the German occupation of Klaipėda (March 1939) and Lithuania's incorporation into the Soviet Union (June 1940).

Notable people from Šventoji
 Evaldas Kairys (born 1990), professional basketball player

References

 

 
Seaside resorts in Lithuania
Palanga City Municipality
Courland Governorate
Geographic history of Latvia
Territorial disputes of Lithuania